Dotty Dripple was an American gag-a-day comic strip, originally started by Jeff Keate & Jim McMenamy on June 26, 1944, but was taken over by Buford Tune on October 16, and continued for the next thirty years. The strip was distributed by Publishers Syndicate and also appeared in comic book form. 

Dotty Dripple was a domestic comedy strip, heavily modeled on Blondie, and ended on June 9, 1974.These Top Cartoonists Tell How They Create America’s Favorite Comics (1964) (excerpt at comics.gearlive.com)

References

External links
Dotty Dripple at Don Markstein's Toonopedia. Archived from the original on April 10, 2016.

1944 comics debuts
1974 comics endings
American comics characters
American comic strips
Comics about married people
Dripple, Dotty
Comics characters introduced in 1944
Dripple, Dotty
Gag-a-day comics